The United States of Matsya, also called Matsya Union or Matsya Sangh, was a State of India which was formed on 18 March 1948 by the merger of four erstwhile princely states, Alwar, Bharatpur, Dholpur, and Karauli after accession. Shobha Ram Kumawat of Indian National Congress was the first and last chief minister of the State from 18 March 1948 till 15 May 1949. Maharaja of Dholpur became its Rajpramukh.

On 15 May 1949, the Matsya Union was merged with Greater Rajasthan, to form the United State of Rajasthan, which later became the state of Rajasthan on 26 January 1950.

References

History of Rajasthan (1947–present)
1948 establishments in India
Political integration of India
Historical Indian regions
States and territories disestablished in 1949
States and territories established in 1948
1949 disestablishments in India